The Ichthyological Society of Hong Kong (ISHK or HKIS) is a non-profit non-government organization in Hong Kong, for professional studies on ichthyology, biodiversity and promotion of ichthyological knowledge to the public.

History 
1 September 2008: Started operation, with Mr. Chong Dee-Hwa as the chairman.

9 January 2010: Inauguration ceremony held at Hong Kong Central Library and a 3-day inaugural exhibition for the public from 9 to 11 of January 2010.

Operations 
Since the establishment in 2008, ISHK promotes ichthyological-science to the public by following activities:
Ichthyological workshops
Stream guidance tours
Guided tours (Day and overnight tours)
Publication of literature

In addition, the society works on matters for promoting ichthyology:
Academic studies and seminars
Setup of fish displaying facilities (e.g., aquariums)
Runs popular lectures (workshops) to the public
Holds exhibitions and seminars upon organizations' invitations
Provides fish-related services (including consultation and support) for the Government, organizations and institutions, mainly on protection and conservation of fishes, ecology, environment.
Validation, investigation and acquisition of fishes species

The society expects to deepen and popularize ichthyology in Hong Kong community, while sending the idea and belief of protecting the environment and ecology, and to encourage the public, especially the new generations, to experience and conserve the nature.

Society Structure 
Dee-hwa CHONG (莊棣華), a Hong Kong senior fish researcher and senior ecological photographer, is the President of the society. In addition, the society possess a handful of committees for operations:
Academic Committee: Maintaining correctness on all affairs
Standing committee members: Kelvin Chan, Tammy Cheung
Educational Committee: Keeping the educational quality of publications
Standing committee members: Yuen-Kwan Mok, Carmen Chan
Informational Committee: Provision of information for publications and activities
Standing committee members: Shue-Yan So
Affair Committee: Supports all society events
Standing committee members: Yui Lee
Assessment Committee: Asseeement on all society affairs
Editorial Committee: Editing on publications and media

Bibliographies

External links
Website of Ichthyological Society of Hong Kong

Professional associations based in Hong Kong
2008 establishments in Hong Kong
Fisheries and aquaculture research institutes
Ichthyology organizations